A coin watch or medal watch comprises a watch inserted into a coin or medal.

A coin watch is typically made by slicing a coin into two disks, one thinner than the other; or by removing one face of a coin. A watch mechanism is then embedded into the thicker part, and the two faces joined by a concealed hinge and catch. When closed, the watch is hidden and the coin looks like any other.

Noted makers of coin watches include Cartier and Corum.

See also

 List of watch manufacturers
 Dollar watch
 Counterfeit watch
 Mystery watch

References

Watches
Coins
Medals